Paris Elia (born January 6, 1972) is a former international Cypriot football defender.

He started his career from Alki Larnaca but he played for many teams such as Anorthosis Famagusta, Nea Salamina, AC Omonia, AEK Larnaca, Ayia Napa FC. For 2007-2008 his team was Ermis Aradippou in Second Division where he finished his career.

Honours
AEK Larnaca
 Cypriot Cup: 2003–04

References

External links
 

1972 births
Living people
Cypriot footballers
Cyprus international footballers
Greek Cypriot people
Association football defenders
Cypriot First Division players
AC Omonia players
Anorthosis Famagusta F.C. players
AEK Larnaca FC players
Alki Larnaca FC players
Nea Salamis Famagusta FC players
Ermis Aradippou FC players